Tikkurilan Palloseura (abbreviated TiPS) is a football club from Tikkurila in Vantaa, Finland. The club was established in 1958 and its main catchment areas comprise Tikkurila and Hakunila in Itä-Vantaa (East Vantaa).  The women's team competes in the Kansallinen Liiga ('National Liga') which is the highest division of women's football in Finland. Men's team competes in the Kolmonen ('Third Division') which is the fourth highest division in Finland. The club's home ground is at Tikkurilan urheilupuisto ('Tikkurila Sports Park').

Background
TiPS men played two seasons in the Ykkönen ('First Division'), the second tier of Finnish football in 1996 and 1997.  They also have had six spells covering 12 seasons in the third tier, the Kakkonen ('Second Division'), in 1980–85, 1991–92, 1995, 1998, 2004 and 2011.

Their history became somewhat distorted in 1998 when Jalkapalloseura Airport City (AC Vantaa) was established as a flagship club for Vantaa following the merger of TiPS and Vantaan Jalkapalloseura men's first teams with assistance from Koivukylän Palloseura, Pallokerho-50 and Itä-Vantaan Urheilijat clubs.  TiPS finished top of the East Group of the Kakkonen (Second Division) in 1998 and their place in the Ykkönen (First Division) in 1999 was taken by the new AC Vantaa club.

TiPS men started again in the Kutonen ('Sixth Division') and by 2004 had progressed through the divisions back to the Kakkonen ('Second Division'), coincidentally at a higher level than AC Vantaa who at the same time had been relegated to the Kolmonen. However their stay in third tier football was this time short-lived and over the last few years TiPS have been playing in the Nelonen (Fourth Division) and Kolmonen (Third Division). TiPS earned promotion back to Kakkonen for the 2011 season, but soon dropped back to Kolmonen.

Tikkurilan Palloseura is better known for its successful women's team and high level girl's junior football. Girls from many age groups have been representing juniors' national teams and are playing in the highest national level.

Tikkurilan Palloseura is one of Finland's largest football clubs, bringing together players and officials from different backgrounds. The club provides coaching and training programmes to ensure equal opportunities for everyone to participate, develop, practice and compete.

Children and young people are able to enjoy football in a familiar and safe environment where opportunities are provided for youngsters to fulfill their potential as well as assisting their social development.

Season to season Men's team

Structure
The club runs a large number of teams including 2 men's teams, 2 women's teams and a very wide range of girls and boys junior teams.  TiPS organises diverse activities for its players including an Academy and Football Coaching Schools.

2011 season
For the current season TiPS Women's Team is competing in the highest level in Naisten Liiga.

TiPS Men's Team is competing in Group B (Lohko B) of the Kakkonen administered by the Finnish FA. This is the third highest tier in the Finnish football system. In 2010 TiPS was promoted from the Kolmonen.

TiPS M2 is participating in Section 2 (Lohko 2) of the Vitonen administered by the Uusimaa SPL. In 2009 TiPS AN were relegated from the Vitonen.

Men's team

Women's team

Squad 

 	

	 	

 	 

	Source:

Honours and achievements

Naisten Ykkönen Winners (2): 2009, 2019
Finnish Women's Cup Winners (4): 2011, 2012, 2013, 2016

References

External links 

Official Club Website (in Finnish)
Suomen Cup (in Finnish)
Tikkurilan Palloseura on Facebook (in Finnish)

Football clubs in Finland
Sport in Vantaa
1958 establishments in Finland